Arita (written: 有田) is a Japanese surname. Notable people with the surname include:

, Japanese politician and diplomat
Isao Arita (born 1926), Japanese physician known for smallpox eradication
, Japanese footballer
, Japanese photographer
, Japanese comedian and television presenter

Japanese-language surnames